Daiene G. Vernile  (born July 1, 1960) is a former politician in Ontario, Canada. She was a Liberal member of the Legislative Assembly of Ontario from 2014 to 2018 who represented the riding of Kitchener Centre. She was a member of cabinet in the government of Kathleen Wynne.

Background
Prior to her election to the legislature, Vernile was a television journalist for CKCO-TV. She lives in Kitchener, Ontario with her husband John. They have three children.

Politics
She ran in the 2014 provincial election as the Liberal candidate in the riding of Kitchener Centre. She defeated Progressive Conservative candidate and former MPP Wayne Wettlaufer by 6,913 votes.

In June 2014, she was appointed as Parliamentary Assistant to the Minister of Research and Innovation.

On January 17, 2018, Vernile was sworn into cabinet as Minister of Tourism, Culture and Sport.

Cabinet positions

References

External links

1961 births
21st-century Canadian politicians
21st-century Canadian women politicians
Canadian television reporters and correspondents
Canadian women television journalists
CTV Television Network people
Journalists from Ontario
Living people
Members of the Executive Council of Ontario
Ontario Liberal Party MPPs
Politicians from Kitchener, Ontario
Women MPPs in Ontario
Women government ministers of Canada